Santa Catalina is a small island off the north coast of the Península de Almina in Ceuta, Spain.

Santa Catalina
Landforms of Ceuta